Alfred Stier  (27 November 1880 – 21 July 1967) was a German composer and music director of the Evangelical-Lutheran Church of Saxony.

Life 
Stier was born in Greiz. After attending primary schools, he went to Leipzig in 1902 to study church music. In Limbach, he received his first position as a full-time church musician in 1904, and in 1911 he went to the Church of Reconciliation, Dresden.  He was a Liedermeister and honorary Alter Herr of the "" Erato Dresden".

In 1933, he was appointed regional church music director. In 1947, he went to Ilsenburg, where from 1948 he was the regional singing director of the Evangelical Church of the Church Province of Saxony. He led numerous singing weeks, courses for choir singing with lay people. He published old church music and composed chamber music, cantatas, choral works and Lieder himself. He was awarded an honorary doctorate from the University of Greifswald in 1955. He died in Ilsenburg in 1967 aged 86.

Work 
 Die Erneuerung der Kirchenmusik. Kassel 1926
 Leitfaden für kirchenmusikalische Arbeit.  Berlin 1947
 Der Dienst des Kirchenmusikers. Eine praktische Handreichung für Kantoren und Organisten in Stadt und Land. (Im Dienst der Kirche 9). Kassel and Basel 1952.
 Kirchliches Singen. Gütersloh 1952
 Musika, eine Gnadengabe Gottes : vom Dienst der Musik am Menschen. Berlin 1960

References

Further reading 
 Sven Hiemke: Zum Schrifttum des Dresdner Kantors Alfred Stier in der NS-Zeit, in Dresden und die avancierte Musik im 20. Jahrhundert. Teil II: 1933–1966, edited by Matthias Herrmann and Hanns-Werner Heister, Laaber 2002,  (Musik in Dresden 5),

External links 
 
 

German composers
20th-century classical composers
1880 births
1967 deaths
People from Greiz